Contamination (a.k.a. Alien Contamination, Toxic Spawn or Larvae) is a 1980 science fiction-horror film directed by Luigi Cozzi and starring Ian McCulloch. The film is about an alien cyclops creature that uses human agents to place eggs all over Earth. The eggs release a gelatinous goo that causes people to explode when they come into physical contact with the substance.
The tagline on the Italian one-sheet ("...e ora tocca a voi!") translates as "...and now it's your turn!".

Plot 

A large ship drifts into New York Harbor, seemingly abandoned. The ship is discovered to be carrying large containers of coffee, hidden inside of which are a series of football-sized green eggs. The crew sent in to explore the ghost ship find the mutilated remains of the former crew gathered in one place, and they soon discover the reason why: when disturbed, the green eggs explode, spraying a viscous liquid over everything. The liquid is toxic to living creatures, and causes the body to immediately explode.

The military's answer to this phenomenon is Colonel Stella Holmes (Marleau). She establishes a link between the green eggs and a recent mission to Mars that ended badly for the two astronauts who descended to the planet. One of them disappeared, and the other, Commander Hubbard (McCulloch), had a breakdown and subsequently became an alcoholic. When pressed, Hubbard agrees to help Holmes in her investigation of the insidious plot to bring the deadly eggs to Manhattan, and it takes them, along with sarcastic New York cop Tony Aris (Masé), to a Colombian coffee plantation. All is not as it seems; Hubbard's former astronaut colleague is apparently alive and well and living under the influence of a monstrous alien cyclops, which is using mind control to further its plot to flood the world with the green eggs and wipe out human life on Earth. Aris falls under the alien's mental influence and is devoured, but Hubbard saves Stella and kills the cyclops by shooting out its eye. Hamilton, only a puppet of the evil alien mind, dies without the alien's power to sustain him. Government agents proceed to confiscate the remaining alien pods. However, a surviving, previously unseen pod explodes on a busy street corner.

Cast 

 Ian McCulloch as Commander Ian Hubbard
 Louise Marleau as Colonel Stella Holmes
 Marino Masé as Lieutenant Tony Aris, NYPD
 Siegfried Rauch as Hamilton
 Gisela Hahn as Perla de la Cruz
 Carlo De Mejo as Agent Young
 Carlo Monni as Dr. Turner
 Mike Morris as Dr. Hilton
 Martin Sorrentino as Black Warehouse Doorman
 Angelo Ragusa as Warehouse Doorman
 Brigitte Wagner as Doctor

Production 

After the success of his film Starcrash, director Luigi Cozzi wanted to follow it up with another science fiction film. On seeing Ridley Scott's film Alien his producer decided he wanted Cozzi to make something similar. Due to budgetary constraints Cozzi decided to set the film on Earth, although retaining the ideas of the alien eggs and a large creature from Scott's film, and wrote a script called Alien Arrives on Earth. Producer Claudio Mancini wanted to use the name Contamination, which had been the working title for an aborted film he had been developing based on the Jane Fonda film The China Syndrome. The name was changed against Cozzi's wishes, with the producer also insisting on Cozzi developing more James Bond-style elements as opposed to his science fiction theme.

The film's production offices were in the same building as those used by the makers of Zombi 2 and, impressed by the profits that film had made, Cozzi decided to try to hire the same cast members, although ultimately Ian McCulloch was the only actor to work on Contamination. Cozzi wanted to use Caroline Munro (who had been featured in Starcrash) as Colonel Holmes but once again the producer overruled him and hired Louise Marleau instead.

Contamination was shot in eight weeks between 14 January and 4 March 1980. The film schedule included three weeks in Rome and then a further two weeks split between location shooting in New York City, Florida and Colombia. Cozzi had wanted to use animation or stop motion photography to realise the alien cyclops at the film's climax but was once again overruled by the producer, and an animatronic version was constructed instead. Cozzi subsequently claimed that this creature failed to work properly and would barely move, so he had to use rapid jump cuts to hide the fact that it was being pulled about by stagehands.

Release and controversy 
Contamination was released in West Germany on 9 May 1980, where it was distributed by Residenz-Film.

After the Video Recordings Act, Contamination was classed as a video nasty. Specifically, the film includes graphic depictions of human bodies exploding violently in slow motion, as well as the grisly remains of such explosions. While the explosion effects are not technically graphic (each of the exploding victims is encased in some kind of bulky costume that is obviously hiding the mechanism that sprays the gore), they are extremely bloody.

Years later, the BBFC classified the uncut version with a 15 certificate. It was released on home video in the United States under the titles Alien Contamination and Toxic Spawn, which are both heavily edited. Cozzi later revealed that Cannon Films, the film's North American distributor, had changed the name to Alien Contamination in order to capitalize on the popularity of Ridley Scott's Alien (1979). It is now available in the US in an unedited version which has been released on DVD.

Arrow Video released the film uncut on Blu-Ray in 2015. The uncut version runs 95 minutes.

Critical reception 

In a contemporary review, Variety referred to the film as a "routine tale" that was a poorly written horror film that did not hide its Italian origins with "silly English dialog" and "poor dubbing" being its giveaways.

From retrospective reviews, Kim Newman (Monthly Film Bulletin) stated that the films combination of "splattery violence", "James Bond spy thriller", and "monster-filled s-f" was "at times uneasy, but Cozzi carries it off with sufficient bravura to paper over the cracks" and that "If the film relies on familiar images...it at least has a class, very loud score by Dario Argento's usual collaborators, The Goblins, to punch up the frissons." Mike Long (DVD Talk) stated that while Contamination "makes good use of the ideas that it's stolen, at heart it is simply another boring Euro-horror film."

In a 2010 interview with Fangoria, Cozzi revealed that the film was made as a ripoff of Alien, going so far as to say, "Without the existence of Alien, we could not have made this movie at all" and that the original title for the film had been Contamination: The Alien Arrives on Earth.

References

Sources

External links 

 

1980 films
1980 horror films
1980s science fiction horror films
Alien invasions in films
Italian science fiction horror films
German science fiction horror films
West German films
1980s Italian-language films
Films about astronauts
Films about extraterrestrial life
Films set in New York City
Films shot in New York City
Films shot in New Jersey
Films scored by Goblin (band)
1980s monster movies
Films directed by Luigi Cozzi
Golan-Globus films
Video nasties
Italian splatter films
1980s Italian films
1980s German films